The demography of London is analysed by the Office for National Statistics and data is produced for each of the Greater London wards, the City of London and the 32 London boroughs, the Inner London and Outer London statistical sub-regions, each of the Parliamentary constituencies in London, and for all of Greater London as a whole. Additionally, data is produced for the Greater London Urban Area. Statistical information is produced about the size and geographical breakdown of the population, the number of people entering and leaving country and the number of people in each demographic subgroup. The total population of London as of 2021 is 8,799,800.

History

Creation of Greater London - 1965 
Through the London Government Act of 1963, the Greater London region was established.

Migration boom - 1997 to today 
From 1997 onwards, London has experienced a drastic change in the composition of the city's population, which has off set the decline of the population which had been occurring. In 1991, 21.7% of the city was foreign born but by 2011 this had risen to 36.7%.

In 2011, a historic tipping point occurred with the release of the 2011 census indicating that the White British population, which had before been the majority, was now a minority of the city's population.

Population

The historical population for the current area of Greater London, divided into the statistical areas of Inner and Outer London is as follows:

Age

Fertility 

In 2021, a total of 110,961 live births occurred within the city. The fertility rate of London in 2021 was 1.52, which is below replacement.

Population density 

The population density of London was 5,727 per km2 in 2011.

Urban and metropolitan area 
At the 2001 census, the population of the Greater London Urban Area was 8,278,251. This area does not include some outliers within Greater London, but does extend into the adjacent South East England and East of England regions. In 2004 the London Plan of the Mayor of London defined a metropolitan region with a population of 18 million. Another definition gives the population of the metropolitan area as 13,709,000.

Ethnicity 
For the overwhelming majority of London's history, the population of the city was ethnically homogenous with the population being of White British ethnic origin, with small amounts of minority groups clustered in most notably East London. From 1948 onwards and especially since 1971, the population has diversified in international terms at an increased rate. In 2011, it was reported for the first time that White British people had become a minority within the city, establishing it was a majority-minority city within the country. In 2005, a survey of London's ethnic and religious diversity claimed that there were more than 300 languages spoken and 50 non-indigenous communities with a population of more than 10,000 in London.

Ethnicity in boroughs 

This table shows the proportion of different multi-ethnic groups by London borough, as found in the 2021 census.

Ethnicity overall 

The following table shows the ethnic group of respondents from estimates in 1971 and in the 1991 – 2021 censuses in Greater London.

Ethnicity of school pupils

Ethnicity of births

Country of birth

The 2021 census recorded that 3,575,740 people or 40.7% of London's population are foreign-born (including 27.9% born in a non-European country).

Languages

According to the 2011 Census, 6,083,420 or 77.9% of London's population aged 3 and over spoke English as a main language, with a further 1,406,912 (19.8%) speaking it as a second language or well to very well. 271,693 (3.5%) could not speak English well, while 47,917 (0.6%) could not speak English at all. 2,456 (<0.1%) spoke other UK minority languages, with the most common being Welsh and 2,926 (<0.1%) used British Sign Language. This shows also great challenges for TfL and other government services, for example most ticket vending machines use only English, French and up to 2 other western Europe hemisphere languages, while as shown below most demand is for Indian languages, Polish etc.

The most common main languages spoken in Greater London according to the 2011 and 2021 censuses are shown below.

Religion

The following table shows the religion of respondents in the 2001 and 2011 censuses in Greater London.

Social issues

Marriage and divorce 
In 2019, a total of 29,139 marriages occurred within London.

Abortion 
In 2020, 27.7% of conceptions were aborted in the city.

Health 
In 2021, the suicide rate in total was 6.6 for every 100,000 people. For males this was 9.9 and for females this was 3.4.

Income and industry 
The vast majority of people within London work in the service sector.

See also

Demography of the United Kingdom
Demography of England
Demography of Birmingham
Demography of Greater Manchester
Religion in London
Religion in England
List of English cities by population
List of English districts by population
List of English districts and their ethnic composition
List of English districts by area
List of English districts by population density

References

Geography of London
London
London
History of London